The Barr Brothers is an indie folk band founded in Montreal, Quebec in 2006, consisting of two American brothers Andrew (drums, percussion, vocals, keyboards) and Brad Barr (guitar, vocals), as well as bassist Morgan Moore, pedal steel guitarist Brett Lanier, and harpist Eveline Gregoire-Rousseau.

History 
Originally from Providence, RI, Brad and Andrew Barr moved to Montreal from Boston, MA in 2005, after a decade of touring and recording as two-thirds of the trio The Slip. That group was noted for its approach to long-form, live Improvisation and was equally considered part of the Jam band and Experimental music scenes.

Soon after moving to Montreal, Brad heard the sounds of a harp through the bedroom wall of his new apartment. He went next door to introduce himself to Sarah Pagé, who was performing both in classical contexts and developing music with the songwriter Lhasa de Sela. Andrew also began performing with Lhasa. Soon the trio of Andrew, Brad and Sarah began performing Brad's songs under the Barr Brothers name, building upon them with Malian rhythms, Slide guitar, homemade percussion instruments, and influences from Delta blues, modern classical and Appalachian musical traditions.

The Barr Brothers' recordings have been nominated three times for Juno Awards: in 2013, 2015 and 2018 for Adult Alternative Album of the Year. Their debut album The Barr Brothers was released in 2011 and focused on acoustic and electrified songs rooted in Appalachian folk. Their second album Sleeping Operator (2014) further explored the connections between the Delta blues and its West and North African ancestry. Leftover songs from the Sleeping Operator sessions were released as a five-track collection Alta Falls (2015). The songs on the EP were partially recorded in Iceland by Valgeir Sigurösson (Björk, Sigur Rós and Nico Muhly). Their third album Queens of the Breakers was released in autumn 2017. Also in 2017, Secret City released a split album called Live, which is The Barr Brothers Live At Festival International De Jazz De Montréal 2015, and Patrick Watson Live At Église Saint-Jean-Baptiste 2013.

The band tours frequently in the United States, Canada, the United Kingdom, and Europe and with some shows played in Japan. Notable venues have included Levon Helm's studio in Woodstock,  New York, the Red Rocks Amphitheater, and two appearances on the Late Show with David Letterman.

Career

2011–2013: The Barr Brothers 
The Barr Brothers toured throughout North America and Europe to support The Barr Brothers, with notable appearances including the 2011 Montreal International Jazz Festival and the 2011 Osheaga. They opened for Ben Harper and Deer Tick, played the CMJ Music Marathon and, in January 2012, made their first appearance on the Late Show with David Letterman. Their song "Beggar In The Morning" debuted on Paste Magazine in March 2012, and they had a headline slot on the main stage Scène TD de la place des Festivals at the 2013 Montreal Jazz Festival; Their song "Ooh, Belle" was used in an episode of the television series Touch.

2014–2016: Sleeping Operator, Alta Falls 
Shortly before the release of Sleeping Operator, The Barr Brothers performed at Oregon's Pickathon. In addition to the Juno nomination, the band was nominated as Most Illustrious Band Outside of Quebec by ADISQ, the Quebec music award council, and the album was nominated as Anglophone Album of the Year. They also received a nomination for Anglophone Show of the Year.

The record was promoted with global touring. Notable support dates included shows with Calexico and My Morning Jacket in the United States and Europe. The My Morning Jacket tour included the Barr Brothers' first performance at Colorado's Red Rocks Amphitheatre.

As headliners, the band performed with Marco Benevento at the Midnight Ramble Sessions at the Levon Helm studios in Woodstock NY,  and performed on the main stage at Osheaga and the Folk On The Rocks festival in Yellowknife. Their most notable headline show was at the Grand Évènement of the Montreal Jazz Festival. Many musician friends made appearances at this show: Patrick Watson, Robbie Kuster, Joe Grass, Michelle Tompkins of Sin & Swoon, Mamadou Kouyaté, and Little Scream's Laurel Sprengelmeyer.

Outside of the band, the Barrs participated in a tribute to The Grateful Dead on the Lachine Canal in the summer of 2016. Following the October 2016 death of Leonard Cohen, Brad Barr participated in a tribute to Cohen's music put together by POP Montreal.

2017–Present: Recording and Collaboration 
Anticipated collaborations with the Malian duo Bassekou Kouyate and Amy Sacko, scheduled for the 2017 editions of the Festival d’Été de Québec and the Montreal International Jazz Festival, were cancelled due to Kouyate and Sacko's Visa issues. Replacement players were found in Burkinabé Balafonist Mamadou Koita and Senegalese Kora player Sadio Sissoko, and the resulting show was well reviewed.

Following the release of Queens of the Breakers, the band was invited to open for The War on Drugs across Europe and the UK; and scheduled their own headline shows in major markets in North America, Europe and the United Kingdom. In January 2018, Sarah Pagé left the band to pursue other interests.

In 2018, Compulsion Games revealed that the brothers worked on the soundtrack and performed the songs for the game We Happy Few.

In October 2018, The Barr Brothers won ADISQ's Félix award for Concert of the Year - Anglophone. They were also nominated in four other categories at Gala de l'ADISQ: Album of the Year - Anglophone; Quebec Artist with the Most Success Outside of Quebec; Sound Recording and Mix of the Year; and Soundman of the Year. They performed again at the Levon Helm Studios in December 2018.

Discography 
 The Barr Brothers (2011) #63 CAN
 Sleeping Operator (2014)
 Alta Falls (2015, EP)
 Queens of the Breakers (2017) #29 CAN
 Live (2017, split with Patrick Watson)

References

External links

Musical groups established in 2006
Musical groups from Montreal
Canadian indie folk groups
English-language musical groups from Quebec